The second edition of the women's hockey tournament at the Commonwealth Games took place during the 2002 Commonwealth Games at the Belle Vue Complex in Manchester, England. The event started on Friday, 26 July, and ended on Saturday, 3 August 2002.

Participating nations

Results

Preliminary round

Pool A

Pool B

Classification matches

Seventh and eighth place

First to sixth place classification

Quarter-finals

Fifth and sixth place

Semi-finals

Third and fourth place

Final

Statistics

Final standings

Goalscorers

Medallists

Awards

Cultural depictions
A fictionalised version of the Indian team's victory at the 2002 Commonwealth Games was depicted in the 2007 film Chak De! India.

References
Fieldhockey Canada

2002
Women's tournament
2002 in women's field hockey
International women's field hockey competitions hosted by England
2002 in English women's sport